Yury Pavlovich Syomin (born 11 May 1947) is a Russian football coach. He has managed FC Lokomotiv Moscow for 4 different stints, for a total of over 23 years. The recent history of the Russian club has been associated with him, as he was also president for a short period.

Biography
Syomin was born on 11 May 1947 in Orenburg. His family moved to Oryol some time later. As a child he has showed interest in football, ice hockey, volleyball, and athletics. His son Andrei Syomin is also a player and a coach.

Player career
At the age of 16, while still attending school, Syomin started his player career at Spartak Oryol, a Soviet Second League club.

One year later he was invited to Spartak Moscow. He has scored two first Spartak's goals in a European competition (in 1966 against OFK Beograd).

At the age of 20, Syomin changed club again, this time to Dynamo Moscow. With this club, he won his only player's trophy, the 1970 Soviet Cup. He calls the spell with Dynamo the most successful period of his player career.

Syomin left Dynamo due to disagreements with the coach after he was not fielded in a European match. After that he has changed several other clubs. Syomin played for Kairat Almaty, Chkalovets Novosibirsk, Lokomotiv Moscow, and Kuban Krasnodar. He ended his career as a player at the age of 33.

Coach career
Syomin started his coaching career in 1983, when he was called to save Pamir Dushanbe, a First League team, from relegation. Syomin succeeded and was recognized as the honorary coach of Tajik SSR for this achievement.

In 1986 Syomin went on to coach FC Lokomotiv Moscow, where he spent 19 years. During the period of his work Lokomotiv transformed from a mid-table club to one of the leaders of Russian football, winning the championship in 2002 and 2004. Syomin also enjoyed cup success, winning Russian Cup five times, Russian Super Cup twice and reaching Cup Winners' Cup semifinal twice.

In 2005 Syomin left Lokomotiv for the Russia national team to help it reach the 2006 FIFA World Cup final tournament. He failed to achieve that and decided to leave the national team. In November 2005, Syomin began coaching Dynamo Moscow, but was sacked in 2006. In 2007, he returned to FC Lokomotiv Moscow as club president, but one year later his contract was terminated due to team's low league position.

Later in 2007 Syomin took over the managerial position with FC Dynamo Kyiv in Ukraine and guided the club to a championship in the 2008-09 season as well as a semi-final appearance in the UEFA Cup.

On 26 May 2009 he quit FC Dynamo Kyiv and returned to FC Lokomotiv Moscow. Under the terms of his contract, he was expected to stay with the club until December 2011. Syomin replaced Rashid Rakhimov (who had been fired a few weeks before that). He was fired as Lokomotiv manager on 29 November 2010. On 24 December 2010, he signed a new contract with Dynamo Kyiv ending in 2012.

On 29 May 2013 Syomin was officially unveiled as manager of Gabala of the Azerbaijani Premier League. After leading Gabala to third in the Premier League and as runners up in the Cup, Syomin left Gabala on 23 May 2014.

Syomin was announced as Anzhi Makhachkala manager on 18 June 2015, signing a one-year contract with the option of an additional year. After gaining only 6 points in first 10 games of the 2015-16 season and with Anzhi in last place, Syomin left Anzhi on 29 September 2015.

On 26 August 2016, Lokomotiv Moscow announced new appointment of Syomin as a manager of the team. He won his third title with the team in the 2017–18 season. He also won the 2016–17 Russian Cup and 2018–19 Russian Cup with the club, meaning he won a trophy in each of his three full seasons of this stint with Lokomotiv.

On 14 May 2020, Lokomotiv's board of directors dismissed Syomin as his contract was expiring on 31 May and they decided not to extend it. The Russian Premier League was suspended at the time due to the COVID-19 pandemic in Russia, with Lokomotiv in 2nd position in the standings.

On 4 August 2021, he was hired by FC Rostov on a two-year contract. In the first 6 league games under his management, Rostov won only one, and after Rostov was eliminated from the Russian Cup by a third-tier club FC Chayka Peschanokopskoye, Syomin resigned on 25 September 2021.

Managerial statistics

Honours

As a player
Dynamo Moscow
 Soviet Cup: 1970

As a manager
Lokomotiv Moscow
Russian Premier League: 2002, 2004, 2017–18
Russian Cup: 1995–96, 1996–97, 1999–00, 2000–01, 2016–17, 2018–19
Russian Super Cup: 2003, 2005, 2019

Dynamo Kyiv
Ukrainian Premier League: 2008–09

References

External links
 Yuri Semin's Russian hills, by Yury Yarygin, Rossiyskaya Gazeta, 15 April 2005 

Soviet footballers
Soviet football managers
Russian football managers
FC Oryol players
FC Spartak Moscow players
FC Dynamo Moscow players
FC Sibir Novosibirsk players
FC Lokomotiv Moscow players
FC Kuban Krasnodar players
FC Kairat players
Soviet Top League players
1947 births
Living people
CSKA Pamir Dushanbe managers
FC Kuban Krasnodar managers
FC Lokomotiv Moscow managers
Russian Premier League managers
Russia national football team managers
FC Dynamo Moscow managers
FC Dynamo Kyiv managers
FC Mordovia Saransk managers
Russian expatriate sportspeople in Kazakhstan
Ukrainian Premier League managers
People from Orenburg
Russian expatriate sportspeople in Ukraine
Russian expatriate football managers
Expatriate football managers in Ukraine
Gabala FC managers
FC Anzhi Makhachkala managers
FC Rostov managers
Recipients of the Order of Honour (Russia)
Recipients of the Medal of the Order "For Merit to the Fatherland" II class
Association football forwards
Sportspeople from Orenburg Oblast